Larry Newton (né Louis I. Nutinsky May 7, 1920 – January 30, 2005) was an American record company entrepreneur who, earlier in his career, worked with several independent labels. He then became sales manager at the 1955 startup of ABC-Paramount Records, ascending to president in 1965. He oversaw what became a major multimarket, multi-label company, which, for its jazz subsidiary Impulse!, included Ray Charles, Oliver Nelson, Archie Shepp, Pharoah Sanders, and John Coltrane.

Career 
Newton's career began in 1938, while still in high school, when he worked in the stockroom of a Columbia distributor in Philadelphia. He became a salesman for Varsity, Combo, and Rainbow Records

Newton enlisted in the U.S. Army in December 1941. He served as a paratrooper during World War II and was honorably discharged November 15, 1945. In 1946, he became sales manager for Black & White Records.

In March 1949, Newton left B&W to become general manager of Peak Records. Also, around July 1949, Newton co-founded, co-owned, and co-managed, with Eddie Heller, Derby Records — which produced hit by the Eddie Wilcox Orchestra, with Sunny Gale singing "Wheel of Fortune" – and Jaye P. Morgan.

Newton overextended financially and, in 1953, formed a record Central Records with Lee Magid 1953. Eventually, in 1954, he had to file for bankruptcy. The Derby masters were sold to RCA where Newton became an executive.

In 1955, Newton became General Manager of Murray Katz's Treat Records, then located at 236 West 55 Street in Manhattan. In 1956, he joined ABC-Paramount as sales manager where, in 1959, he rose to vice president of sales and, in 1965, president.

1967 saw Newton's most infamous decision: his refusal to promote Louis Armstrong's recording of the song "What a Wonderful World". The song had been written with Armstrong in mind, but when Armstrong, who had recently signed with ABC Records, was recording it, Newton tried to stop the session, because he disliked the slow pace. Newton was physically locked out of the studio, and the session continued with him fuming outside. Afterward, Newton put no promotion effort into the single, calling it a mistake. As a result of Newton's attitude, "What a Wonderful World" did not do well in the U.S., though it succeeded elsewhere in the world, including hitting #1 in the UK. It remained essentially unknown in the United States until 20 years later, when it gained popularity after being used in the 1987 film Good Morning, Vietnam.

In 1970, Newton became vice-president of ABC Pictures. In 1972, he returned to the record business by co-founding and heading GSF Records.

Death 
Sometime in the 1940s, Newton married Dorothy Liberman (aka "Dolly;" 1921–2014). He died on January 30, 2005, in Pompano Beach, Florida. He was 84 years old. Larry and his wife are both buried at Star of David Memorial Gardens, North Lauderdale, Florida.

Notes

References

1920 births
2005 deaths
American music industry executives
Jazz record producers
United States Army personnel of World War II